Laura Grasemann (born 30 April 1992 in Heidelberg) is a German freestyle skier, specializing in moguls.

Grasemann competed at the 2014 Winter Olympics for Germany. She placed 26th in the first qualifying round in the moguls, failing to advance. In the second qualifying round, she placed 12th, again not advancing.

As of September 2015, her best showing at the World Championships is 9th, in the 2015 moguls.

Grasemann made her World Cup debut in December 2008. As of September 2015, her best World Cup finish is 12th, in a pair of moguls events. Her best World Cup overall finish is 24th, in 2014–15.

References

External links
 
 
 
 

1992 births
Living people
Olympic freestyle skiers of Germany
Freestyle skiers at the 2014 Winter Olympics
Sportspeople from Heidelberg
German female freestyle skiers
21st-century German women